The 1983 Jacksonville State Gamecocks football team represented Jacksonville State University as a member of the Gulf South Conference (GSC) during the 1983 NCAA Division II football season. Led by seventh-year head coach Jim Fuller, the Gamecocks compiled an overall record of 6–5 with a mark of 4–4 in conference play, and finished tied for fourth in the GSC.

Schedule

References

Jacksonville State
Jacksonville State Gamecocks football seasons
Jacksonville State Gamecocks football